The Apsilae or Apsili were an ancient tribe inhabiting the territory of Apsilia, in modern Abkhazia.

Location
The tribal territory was located on the Black Sea coast of the northwest Caucasus, between present day town of New Athos and the village of Tsebelda slightly east of modern day Sukhumi. It consisted of two historical regions - Gumae and Abzhywa. The most important cities were: Tusuml, Tzibile, Pustae, Zkibin, Skotar, Mokva. The capital was Sebastopolis.

Identity
The Apsilae descended from the coastal part of the ancient Zygii tribes, most notably the Trakhea, Tsibil and Tsakhar. The name Apsilae suggests that they may have been the ancestors of the Abkhaz people (in Abkhaz Аҧсуаа Apswa) ref. Armenian language "Psinoun". 

Their culture is known as the Tsebelda culture, marked by well-developed local manufacturing of metal products and tools.

History
The first known record of the Apsilae occurs in the writings of Pliny of the 1st century AD, as well as of Flavius Arrianus in the 2nd century. Under King Julian (Julianus) of Apsilia rules and customs were first codified. The territory became an official division of the Roman Empire under Trajan (98-117). It was absorbed by the surrounding, more powerful principality of the Abasgoi, in approximately 730 AD, and the Apsilae are no longer recorded after the second half of the 8th century. Later, and after the inclusion of other territories and people including Misiminia, it became the Kingdom of Abkhazia.

References

Historical ethnic groups of Russia
Ancient peoples of Georgia (country)
History of Abkhazia
Ancient history of the Caucasus